Progressive may refer to:

Politics 
 Progressivism, a political philosophy in support of social reform
 Progressivism in the United States, the political philosophy in the American context
 Progressivism in South Korea, the political philosophy in the South Korean context
 Progressive realism, an American foreign policy paradigm focused on producing measurable results in pursuit of widely supported goals

Political organizations 
 Congressional Progressive Caucus, members within the Democratic Party in the United States Congress dedicated to the advancement of progressive issues and positions
 Progressive Alliance (disambiguation)
 Progressive Conservative (disambiguation)
 Progressive Party (disambiguation)
 Progressive Unionist (disambiguation)

Other uses in politics 
 Progressive Era, a period of reform in the United States (c. 1890–1930)
 Progressive tax, a type of tax rate structure

Arts, entertainment, and media

Music 
 Progressive music, a type of music that expands stylistic boundaries outwards
 "Progressive" (song), a 2009 single by Kalafina
 "Progressive" (Megumi Ogata and Aya Uchida song), the ending theme to the 2014 video game Danganronpa Another Episode: Ultra Despair Girls
 Progressive, a demo album by the band Haggard

Other uses in arts, entertainment, and media 
 Progressive chess, a chess variant
 Progressive talk radio, a talk radio format devoted to expressing liberal or progressive viewpoints of issues
 The Progressive, an American left-wing magazine

Brands and enterprises 
 Progressive Corporation, a U.S. insurance company
 Progressive Enterprises, a New Zealand retail cooperative

Healthcare 
 Progressive disease
 Progressive lens, a type of corrective eyeglass lenses

Religion 
 Progressive Adventism, a sect of the Seventh-day Adventist Church
 Progressive Christianity, a movement within contemporary Protestantism
 Progressive creationism, a form of Old Earth creationism
 Progressive Islam, a modern liberal interpretation of Islam
 Progressive Judaism, a major denomination within Judaism
 Progressive religion, a religious tradition which embraces theological diversity
 Progressive revelation (Bahá'í), a core teaching of Bahá'í that suggests that religious truth is revealed by God progressively and cyclically over time
 Progressive revelation (Christianity), the concept that the sections of the Bible written later contain a fuller revelation of God

Technology 
 Progressive disclosure, a technique used in human computer interaction
 Progressive scan, a form of video transmission
 Progressive shifting, a technique for changing gears in trucks
 Progressive stamping, a metalworking technique

Verb forms 
 Progressive aspect (also called continuous), a verb form that expresses incomplete action
 Past progressive
 Perfect progressive aspects, see Uses of English verb forms and English verbs

Other uses 
 Progressive education, which emphasizes a hands-on approach to learning
 Progressive Field (originally Jacobs Field), home of the Cleveland Guardians
 Progressive function, a function in mathematics

See also 
 
 
 Progress (disambiguation)
 Progression (disambiguation)
 Progressivism (disambiguation)